Alfred Müller or Alfred Mueller may refer to:

Alfred Müller (entrepreneur) (1888–1945), Croatian entrepreneur
Alfred Müller-Armack (1901–1978), German economist and politician
Alfred Müller (runner) (1905–1959), German Olympic middle-distance runner
Alfred Müller (general) (1915–1997), German Wehrmacht general
Alfred Müller (swimmer) (born 1948), German Olympic swimmer
Alfred Mueller (born 1939), American theoretical physicist
Alfred Müller-Felsenburg, honored by the Alfred-Müller-Felsenburg-Preis literary prize in Germany
Alfred Muller (1940-2020), former (1993-1997) French deputy